Aurouër is a commune in the Allier department in the Auvergne-Rhône-Alpes region of central France.

The inhabitants of the commune are known as Aurouërois or Aurouëroises.

Geography

The whole eastern border of the commune is the departmental boundary between Allier and Nièvre. Access to the commune is by the D133 road from Villeneuve-sur-Allier in the south-west which passes through the commune and the village and continues east to Saint-Ennemond. The D228 goes north-east from the village to Dornes. Apart from the village there are the hamlets of:

Les Berthomiers
Le Bois Canot
Bonnefond
Les Cantes
Champfroid
Le Charlet
Les Chenes
Le Choulton
Le Domaine Chateau
Domaine Martin
Les Durands
Les Forets
Les Gallets
Les Gouffats
Les Grillets
La Joubarde
Lafat
Lardillat
La Motte
La Motte-Ponay
La Niziere
La Noue
Le Ponay
Les Simonets
Les Torterats
Vaucoulmin
Les Vernes

There are large forested areas in the south-east of the commune with most of the rest farmland.

There are many ponds scattered across the commune from which streams flow towards the west to join the Allier.

Neighbouring communes and villages

Administration

List of Successive Mayors

Demography
In 2017 the commune had 413 inhabitants. Between 1837 and 1879 it was part of the commune Villeneuve-sur-Allier.

See also
Communes of the Allier department

References

External links
Aurouër on the old IGN website 
Aurouër on Géoportail, National Geographic Institute (IGN) website 
Aurouer on the 1750 Cassini Map

Communes of Allier
Bourbonnais